Toto and the Women is a 1952 Italian film directed by Mario Monicelli and Steno.

Plot
The cloth retailer Philip (Totò) is no longer able to stand his possessive and tyrannical wife (Ave Ninchi) who claims a higher lifestyle. In fact, for years now after the wedding, Philip was totally deprived of his freedom as a husband. The only freedom left is to hole up in the attic reading police novels and venerating an altar dedicated to the infamous serial killer Landru. The balance family collapses as the younger daughter of Philip became engaged to a young doctor (Peppino De Filippo): to prove to everyone her talent in giving injections, she decides, along with her mother, to use the poor Philip as a guinea pig. When enough is enough, Philip decides live the high life together with his young lover. However Philip soon realizes that the girl is too young for him and, avoiding ridiculousness, breaks off the relationship. At home, things get worse: his wife is complaining about the low wage and tells him about the poor quality of what she has been cooking for years and how she was forced to pawn her gold jewelry. Anyway, the marriage of the couple's daughter is the chance to find new finance and strength and the pair get back together. The easy moral is that women are hard to manage but unmissable as well.

Cast
 Totò as Filippo Scaparro
 Lea Padovani as Ginetta
 Franca Faldini as La signora dell'appuntamento
 Ave Ninchi as Giovanna Scaparro
 Giovanna Pala as Mirella Scaparro
 Clelia Matania as La cameriera
 Alda Mangini as La signora nel negozio
 Primarosa Battistella as Antonietta
 Teresa Pellati as Irene
 Mario Castellani as Rag. Carlini
 Peppino De Filippo as Il dottor Desideri
 Pina Gallini as La suocera
 Carlo Mazzarella as Il presentatore del concorso di bellezza

External links
 

 

1952 films
1950s Italian-language films
1952 comedy films
Italian black-and-white films
Films set in Rome
Films directed by Mario Monicelli
Films directed by Stefano Vanzina
Films scored by Carlo Rustichelli
Films with screenplays by Age & Scarpelli
Italian comedy films
1950s Italian films